Mannheimer Fußballgesellschaft Germania was an early German association football club, founded in 1897 in the city of Mannheim, Baden-Württemberg.

FG was one of five founding members of the Mannheimer Fußball-Bund established in 1899. The club went on to also become a founding member of the DFB (Deutscher Fußball Bund or German Football Association) at Leipzig in 1900.

Literature
 DFB (Hrsg.): Deutsches Fußball-Jahrbuch, Band 1904. Verlag Grethlein und Co., Leipzig 1904.

References

Football clubs in Germany
Defunct football clubs in Germany
Defunct football clubs in Baden-Württemberg
Sport in Mannheim
Association football clubs established in 1897
1897 establishments in Germany